Dyadobacter sediminis  is a Gram-negative, aerobic, rod-shaped and non-motile bacterium from the genus of Dyadobacter.

References 

Cytophagia
Bacteria described in 2015